Sean Flynn may refer to:

Sean Flynn (photojournalist), actor and photojournalist, son of Errol Flynn
Sean Flynn (footballer), English footballer
"Sean Flynn" (song), a song by The Clash about the photojournalist
Sean Flynn (actor), American actor
Sean Flynn (cyclist), Scottish cyclist

Flynn, Sean